"(I've Got) Beginner's Luck" is a song composed by George Gershwin, with lyrics by Ira Gershwin, written for the 1937 film Shall We Dance, it was introduced by Fred Astaire. It's a brief comic tap solo with cane where Astaire's rehearsing to a record of the number is cut short when the record gets stuck.
Astaire's commercial recording for Brunswick (No. 7855) was very popular in 1937.

Other notable recordings 
Ella Fitzgerald - Ella Fitzgerald Sings the George and Ira Gershwin Songbook (1959)

References

Songs about luck
Songs with music by George Gershwin
Songs with lyrics by Ira Gershwin
Fred Astaire songs
1937 songs
Songs written for films